Following is a list of instruments used in the practice of anesthesia


Instrument list

Anesthetic machine 

General anesthesia does not always require the anesthetic machine, tested daily, as basic equipment. Anesthesia machines may differ in appearance, size and degree of sophistication but generally speaking, they consist of sections for:
 ventilation
 Peripheral Nerve Stimulator
 space for monitoring equipment
 accessories
 storage space
 worktop
It is imperative that essential medical pipeline gas supply, e.g. oxygen], nitrous oxide and air, are secured firmly to the machine, and readily available without any obstructions, defects or pressure leaks. They should also be checked in between cases, ensuring that the breathing apparatus and breathing circuit are fully patent, for the safe anesthesia of patients. Major manufacturers of anesthetic machines are General Electric (GE), Larsen & Toubro Limited, Draeger and MAQUET.

Image gallery

See also
 Anesthetic machine

References

Further reading
 
 
 

Anesthesia